Leptusa pulchella is a species of beetle belonging to the family Staphylinidae.

Synonym:
 Geostiba pulchella (Baudi di Selve, 1870)

References

Staphylinidae